Cryodraco atkinsoni is a bathydemersal species of marine ray-finned fish belonging to the family Channichthyidae, the crocodile icefishes. It is endemic to the waters of the eastern part of the Southern Ocean.

Taxonomy
Cryodraco atkinsoni was first formally described in 1914 by the English ichthyologist Charles Tate Regan with the type locality given as the Ross Sea in the Southern Ocean where it had been collected by the Terra Nova Expedition. Some authorities treat this taxon as a synonym of C. antarcticus. However, recent morphological and molecular analyses have found that this species is a distinct species from C. anatarcticus. The specific name honours Edward Leicester Atkinson who was the surgeon on the Terra Nova Expedition.

Description 
The first dorsal fin is blackish and the dusky-colored pelvic fins are elongated. The dorsal fins contain 3 spines and 42 soft rays while the anal fin has 46 soft rays.

Distribution, habitat and biology
Cryodraco atkinsoni is found in the Southern Ocean where it confined to the waters of the eastern Antarctic. This predatory species feeds on fishes and krill.

Fisheries
Cryodraco atkinsoni is of no importance to commercial fisheries.

References

Fauna of Antarctica
atkinsoni
Fish described in 1914
Fish of the Southern Ocean
Taxa named by Charles Tate Regan